Huangqi (historically known as Huángqí ; also known as Fèngqí ) is a town in Lianjiang County, Fuzhou, Fujian, China.

History
In September 1958, Huangqi Commune was established.

In April 1979, Tailu Commune and Ankai Commune were established from parts of Huangqi Commune.

In June 1984, Huangqi Commune became Huangqi Township. In November 1984,  Huangqi Township became Huangqi Town.

On December 23, 2015, the Huangqi-Matsu ship route was introduced as part of the Mini Three Links.

Geography

The shortest distance between Huangqi and the Matsu Islands is also the shortest distance between China (PRC) administered territory and territory in the ROC-administered Matsu Islands.

Islands in Huangqi include:
Donggu Jiao / Donggujiao Qundao 
Houyu Dao 
Jinsha Niuyu Dao 
Jinsha Qundao 
Niuweidongyu Dao 
Pingkuai Yu 
Pingniuweiyu Dao 
Sanyayu Dao 
Shangjiaoyu Dao 
Shujiaoyu Dao 
Shukuai Yu 
Yangtan Dao 
Yuanshanzaiyu Dao 
Zhijiao Yu

Administrative divisions
Huangqi includes four residential communities and seven villages:

Four residential communities:
Haifeng, Haixin, Haiying, Haijian

Seven villages:
Changsha (Ch’ang-sha), Chi'ao / Chiwo (Ch’ih-ao;  / ), Dajian, Chicai, Houlun ( / ), Dagu, Gushi

Demographics

Gallery

See also 
 List of township-level divisions of Fujian

References

External links

 北竿-黃岐線／黃岐鎮街景、傳統市場　4小時停留1日生活圈 

Township-level divisions of Fujian
Towns in Fujian
Lianjiang County